The Arcs are an American garage rock band formed by Dan Auerbach, the guitarist and vocalist of the Black Keys. The band consists of Auerbach, Leon Michels, Nick Movshon, Homer Steinweiss, and formerly Richard Swift, who died in 2018. They released their debut album Yours, Dreamily, in 2015. Their second album, Electrophonic Chronic, was released in January 2023.

History
Auerbach announced this side project after performing on the Governors Ball in 2015. The group's first album, Yours, Dreamily, was released on September 4, 2015. Members include Leon Michels, Nick Movshon, Homer Steinweiss, and Richard Swift, along with contributions from Kenny Vaughan and Flor de Toloache. The Arcs performed at the 2016 Coachella Festival along with Wayhome and Osheaga. Swift died in July 2018.

A second album was first announced by the band while touring in 2015 but failed to materialize. On October 13, 2022, the band announced their second studio album, Electrophonic Chronic, which was released on January 27, 2023, through Auerbach's Easy Eye Sound label. The announcement coincided the release of the album's lead single, "Keep on Dreamin'". The album features the band's full original lineup, including Swift. It was recorded primarily before Swift's death, at Auerbach's Easy Eye Sound studio in Nashville, Electric Lady Studios in Manhattan, and Michels' Diamond Mine studio in Queens, New York. It was co-produced by Auerbach and Michels. In the album's press release, Auerbach said, "This new record is all about honoring Swift. It's a way for us to say goodbye to him, by revisiting him playing and laughing, singing. It was heavy at times, but I think it was really helpful to do it."

Members
Current members
Dan Auerbach – lead vocals, electric guitar (2015–present)
Leon Michels – farfisa organ, synthesizer, electric guitar, drum pads (2015–present)
Nick Movshon – bass guitar (2015–present)
Homer Steinweiss – drums, percussion, bass guitar (2015–present)

Former members
Richard Swift – drums, percussion, keyboards, drum pads, backing vocals (2015–2018; his death)

Contributors
Flor de Toloache – lead vocals, backing vocals, trumpet, violin, vihuela
Kenny Vaughan – baritone guitar, electric guitar

Discography

Albums

EPs

Singles

Music videos 
 Outta My Mind
 Put a Flower in Your Pocket
 Keep on Dreamin'

References

American garage rock groups
American indie rock groups
Musical groups established in 2015
2015 establishments in the United States
Nonesuch Records artists
Warner Records artists